West Prairie is a rural locality in the Toowoomba Region, Queensland, Australia. In the  West Prairie had a population of 79 people.

History 
The locality takes its name from the Prairie pastoral run operated by Henry Stuart Russell in 1855. On Buxton's Map of the Darling Downs, 1864, the run is shown in the hands of Russell and Taylor.

In 1877,  of land was resumed from the West Prairie pastoral run to establish smaller farms. The land was offered for selection on 24 April 1877.

West Prairie Provisional School opened on 19 January 1885. On 1 January 1909 it became West Prairie State School. In 1918 it became a half-time provisional school in conjunction with St Ruth Provisional School (meaning the two schools shared a single teacher) and then it closed in early 1919. It reopened on 25 August 1925 but closed permanently in 1929.

In the  West Prairie had a population of 79 people.

Reference 

Toowoomba Region
Localities in Queensland